Agnete Friis may refer to:

Agnete Friis (writer) (born 1974), Danish writer
Agnete Friis (badminton), Danish badminton player